Melon was a group formed by former Plastics members Toshio Nakanishi and Chica Sato.  When Plastics broke up in 1982, Toshio and Sato went to New York City and formed Melon with  friends Percy Jones of Brand X, Dougie Bowne of The Lounge Lizards, and Bernie Worrell of Funkadelic, trying to merge funk with Japanese and became known as a quirky, exotic, pop band.  Chica's appearances in Toshi's projects since Melon have dwindled, but Toshio continues collaborating music acts, changing sounds and names: Tycoon Tosh, Group of Gods, Love T.K.O., Major Force and Skylab being some of the most often used.

Discography

Albums
Do You Like Japan? (1982) Alfa Records
Do The Pithecan - Happy Age (1984) (12", Pin) Fuzz Dance Records
Deep Cut (1987) Epic Records
Hardcore Hawaiian (1987) Epic Records
Shinjuku Bladerunner (1987) Alfa Records, Inc.
Do You Like Japan? (2005, rerelease) Sony Music Direct (Japan) Inc.

Singles
"Serious Japanese" (1985) Ten Records Ltd. (10 Records)
"The Gate of Japonesia" (1987) Epic Records

External links
Discography
Band overview

American new wave musical groups
Japanese new wave musical groups
Musical groups from New York City

ja:プラスチックス